Elachista cucullata is a moth of the family Elachistidae. It is found in North America, where it has been recorded from California, Florida, Indiana, Maine, Massachusetts, Mississippi, New Jersey, New Mexico, Ohio, Ontario, Pennsylvania, Quebec and West Virginia.

The wingspan is 8–9 mm. The forewings are dark brown, nearly black, with a faint golden or bronzy luster. There is a silvery fascia near the base, a curved silvery white fascia which ends abruptly before reaching the dorsal margin and a triangular silvery spot at the tornus. Beyond it is a longer curved and oblique silvery costal spot. The hindwings are dark greyish brown. Adults have been recorded on wing from May to July.

The larvae feed on various Carex species, including Carex jamesii. They mine the stem leaves of their host plant. In autumn, larvae create a narrow linear mine from the tip downward along the midrib. In spring, this mine is enlarged, eventually occupying most of the breadth of the leaf. Full-grown larvae have a red body and a brownish red head.

References

cucullata
Moths described in 1921
Moths of North America